Svay Chrum District is a district located in Svay Rieng Province, Cambodia. The district is subdivided into 17 khums and 168 phums. According to the 1998 census of Cambodia, it had a population of 129,573.

References 

Districts of Svay Rieng province